The 1858 Atlantic hurricane season was one of only three Atlantic hurricane seasons on record in which every tropical cyclone intensified into a hurricane (the others were in 1852 and 1884).  The first hurricane was first observed over the northwestern Caribbean Sea on June 12.  The sixth and final storm was last noted on October 26. These dates fall within the period with the most tropical cyclone activity in the Atlantic.  Three tropical cyclones during the season existed simultaneously.  Two of the cyclones have only a single known point in its track due to a sparsity of data.  Operationally, another tropical cyclone was believed to have existed over the eastern Atlantic between September 17 and September 18, but HURDAT – the official Atlantic hurricane database – excludes this system.  However, in the absence of modern satellite and other remote-sensing technologies, only cyclones that affected populated land areas or encountered ships at sea are currently known, so the actual total could be higher.  An undercount bias of zero to four tropical cyclones per year between 1886 and 1910 has been estimated.  Of the six known 1858 Atlantic cyclones, five were first documented in 1995 by Jose Fernandez-Partagas and Henry Diaz.

The first system was spotted over the western Caribbean Sea on June 12. It had a single-point track. Another tropical cyclone was first observed over the northern Atlantic Ocean on August 5 and also had a single-point track. On September 14, the next system was observed over the southeastern Gulf of Mexico. Several hours later, the storm struck Florida, causing severe damage to crops. Strong winds and rough seas were reported by ships and on land, particularly in Maine. The storm dissipated on September 17. That same day, another tropical cyclone developed over the central Atlantic. The storm capsized the bark Phantom, though no one drowned. The next hurricane developed over the Bahamas on September 22, but caused little damage, despite its proximity to land. On October 21, the sixth and final system of the season was first observed over the Bahamas. The storm brought coastal flooding to Nassau and Bermuda later in its duration, before dissipating on October 26.

Timeline

Systems

Hurricane One

On June 12, the brig L. H. Sampson encountered a hurricane in the northwestern Caribbean Sea. The vessel suffered some damage. The storm was a Category 1 hurricane on the modern day Saffir–Simpson hurricane wind scale, based on winds of 80 mph (130 km/h) observed by the L. H. Sampson.

Hurricane Two

A Category 1 hurricane was first observed about 585 mi (940 km) west-northwest of Corvo Island in the Azores on August 5, based on reports from two ships, the Shelter and the A.Z.Greenland. Another ship that encountered the storm, the Magistrate, was abandoned.

Hurricane Three

The bark Cavallo encountered experienced severe weather in the eastern Gulf of Mexico between September 13 and September 15. It is believed that a tropical storm developed on September 14. Moving northeastward, the storm made landfall near modern-day Palmetto, Florida at 15:00 UTC, with winds of 70 mph (110 km/h). While crossing the state, the storm brought severe damage. Ships remained in port at river ports in the state and at St. Marys, Georgia. After emerging into the Atlantic Ocean near Oak Hill, Florida early on September 15, the system reached hurricane status several hours later. Shortly thereafter, the storm intensified into a Category 2 hurricane, peaking with winds of 105 mph (165 km/h). On September 16, the hurricane passed offshore North Carolina and then weakened to a Category 1 hurricane while east of the Mid-Atlantic states.

At 17:00 UTC on September 16, the storm made landfall near East Hampton, New York with winds of 80 mph (130 km/h). About an hour later, it struck again just west of Groton, Connecticut with winds of 75 mph (120 km/h). Early on September 17, the system weakened to a tropical storm and dissipated over the Gulf of Saint Lawrence several hours later. Parts of this storm were first described by David M. Ludlum, who called it The New England Tropical Storm of 1858. However, barometer readings taken at Sag Harbor, New York and Providence, Rhode Island, along with ship reports and wind speeds recorded at Bangor, Maine and Nantucket, Massachusetts, conclude that the system reached hurricane intensity. In Maine, strong gales occurred, with Bangor reported having "one of the heaviest in years." Trees and chimneys toppled throughout the southeastern portions of the state. There was also minor damage to shipping in Belfast.

Hurricane Four

On September 17, a hurricane was observed in the mid-Atlantic by the bark Phantom. Later that day, the Phantom sank, though all of the crew survived. They described the system as a 'perfect hurricane' with a lull around midnight on September 17 before the wind changed direction and blew with even greater force than before. The hurricane continued travelling on a northwest track and between September 22 and the night of September 23 it was encountered by the Hudson, the City of Washington and the bark Lanark. The system weakened to a tropical storm early on September 24 and dissipated later that day about 610 mi (980 km) east of Cape Race, Newfoundland. Until reanalysis, this storm was considered two separate systems, including in the 1995 study by Partagas and Diaz. However, they stated that further information could indicate a single storm.

Hurricane Five

Based on reports from the bark Wh H. Chandler, a tropical storm developed in the Bahamas near Acklins on September 22. Moving northward, the storm strengthened into a Category 1 hurricane by 12:00 UTC the next day. Later on September 23, the Harkaway noted a "severe hurricane" at Bermuda, though the report was considered "doubtful" due to the storm's distance from the island.

Hurricane Six

The final known tropical cyclone of the season was first observed by the brig Sea Lark on October 21, while located just north of Inagua in the Bahamas. Throughout the Bahamas, storm surge impacted some islands. At Nassau, several ships were driven ashore, parts of the town were flooded and buildings along the shoreline suffered damage. The storm moved northeastward and strengthened into a hurricane at 12:00 UTC on October 22. About 24 hours later, the hurricane deepened into a Category 2 hurricane. Later on October 23, it passed just west of Bermuda. Gale force winds and rough seas were observed on the island, causing damage to several vessels. Peaking with winds of 105 mph (165 km/h), the storm began to weaken, falling to Category 1 intensity on October 25. It weakened to a tropical storm early the following day and dissipated hours later, while located about 195 mi (315 km) east-southeast of Sable Island.

See also

 List of tropical cyclones
 Atlantic hurricane season

References

Atlantic hurricane seasons
 
Articles which contain graphical timelines
Hurricanes
1858 meteorology